The Fourth String Quartet by American composer Elliott Carter was composed in 1985–86 in New York City and Rome, and completed in June 1986. It was premiered on September 17, 1986 at Festival Miami, University of Miami, Florida by the Composers String Quartet.

Form and content

In contrast to the collage forms employed by Carter in the 1970s, the Fourth Quartet (similar to the nearly contemporaneous Triple Duo and Penthode) begins with an opposition of instrumental forces and then moves toward a rhapsodically accelerating finale that draws these opposed instruments into a continuous melodic line. The quartet can be heard as "an intensifying dispute, accompanied by a rising sense of intoxication". Each instrument has its own repertory of pitch intervals and its own structural speed. A polyrhythm of 12:126:175:98 governs the structure of the entire composition, usually resulting in rhythmic relations of 8:6:5:7 (the cello plays septuplets nearly all the time).

Movements

 Appassionato
 Scherzando (stesso tempo)
 Lento (stesso tempo)
 Presto

Typical running time - 24'

Discography
Carter, Elliott. The Works for String Quartet vol. 1 [Quartets Nos. 1 & 4]. Arditti String Quartet. CD audio, Etcetera KTC 1065. Amsterdam and Diepholz (West Germany): Etcetera, 1988.
Carter, Elliott. String Quartet no. 1 (1951); String Quartet No. 2 (1959); String Quartet No. 3 (1971) ; String quartet No. 4 (1986); Duo for Violin and Piano (1974). Juilliard String Quartet; Christopher Oldfather, piano. 2 CD audio discs. Sony S2K 47229 (47256 and 47257). New York: Sony Classical, 1990.
Carter, Elliott. The Complete String Quartets 1–5. Pacifica Quartet. 3 CD audio discs. Naxos 8.503226 (18559362; 8559363; 8559614). Franklin, Tenn.: Naxos of America, 2010.
 Composers String Quartet. Three Contemporary American String Quartets [Mel Powell, String Quartet; Elliott Carter, String Quartet No. 4; Milton Babbitt, String Quartet No. 5]. CD audio, Music & Arts CD 606. Berkeley: Music & Arts, 1988.

References

Schiff, David. 1998. The Music of Elliott Carter, second edition. Ithaca: Cornell University Press. . 
Schiff, David. 2001. "Carter, Elliott (Cook)". The New Grove Dictionary of Music and Musicians, second edition, edited by Stanley Sadie and John Tyrrell. London: Macmillan Publishers.

Further reading
Kim, Helen Heran. 2001. "Elliott Carter's Fifth and Fourth String Quartets: An Analytical Study". DMA diss. New York: Juilliard School.  
Schiff, David. 1989. "Carter's New Classicism". College Music Symposium 29:115–22.

4
1986 compositions